Strahinja Jovančević (born 28 February 1993) is a Serbian athlete specializing in long jump. Born in Belgrade to Montenegrin Serb parents from Berane. At the 2019 European Athletics Indoor Championships in Glasgow Jovančević won bronze with 8,03 meter jump. Oftentimes he is running sprint, especially for national team relay 4×100m.

International competitions

References

External links
 Profile at EAA 
 Profile at IAAF

1993 births
Living people
Serbian male long jumpers
Athletes from Belgrade
Serbs of Montenegro
Serbian people of Montenegrin descent